Stan Sheehan (8 September 1886 – 3 August 1957) was an Australian rules footballer who played with St Kilda in the Victorian Football League (VFL).

Notes

External links 

1886 births
1957 deaths
Australian rules footballers from Victoria (Australia)
St Kilda Football Club players